Tyldesley is a town in Greater Manchester, England

Tyldesley may also refer to:

 Tyldesley (ward), an electoral ward of the Wigan Metropolitan Borough Council

People
 Catherine Tyldesley (born 1983), British actress and model
 Clive Tyldesley (born 1954), British sports commentator
 Dick Tyldesley (1897–1943), Lancashire cricketer, unrelated to Johnny or Ernest
 Ernest Tyldesley (1889–1962), Lancashire County Cricket Club's highest run scorer, brother of Johnny
 Johnny Tyldesley (1873–1930), Lancashire County Cricket Club player, brother of Ernest
 Joyce Tyldesley, English archaeologist
 Thomas Tyldesley (1612–1651), Royalist commander in the English Civil War
 Thurstan Tyldesley, English MP

English toponymic surnames